This is a list of hundreds of Lebanese citizens believed to be  illegally  imprisoned in Syria.

List of Lebanese detained in Syrian prisons

Syrian Response
In 2000, Syria released 54 Lebanese political prisoners, which according to the Syrian side were all its prisoners. Syria has also affirmed the existence of 88 Lebanese citizens under criminal sentences and hence, according to the Syrian side, are not political prisoners but are having their regular criminal sentences.

Rafic Hariri's Response
Before the 54 Lebanese prisoners were released from the Syrian side, lists that include around 260 Lebanese prisoners were being spread, which were according to him during a speech on 2000/12/12 inaccurate and would "make us remember all the civil war's terrible mess again", and that Syria has released the Lebanese citizens it had, supporting Syria's claim that it had released all its political prisoners.

See also
 Lebanon
 Lebanese Civil War

References

External links
Detailed List of Lebanese Detained in Syria
Rapport Alternatif Solida Syrie 2005

Syrian jails
Syrian jails
Lists of prisoners and detainees